The Group 2 racing class referred to regulations for cars in touring car racing and rallying, as regulated by the FIA. Group 2 was replaced by Group A in 1982.

The FIA established Appendix J regulations for Touring and GT cars for 1954 and the term Group 2 was in use to define Touring Cars in the Appendix J of 1959. By 1961 Appendix J included specifications for both Group 1 Series Touring Cars and Group 2 Improved Touring Cars with a minimum production of 1,000 units in twelve consecutive months required to allow homologation of a model into either group. Technical modifications beyond those allowed for Group 1 cars were permitted in Group 2.

The British Saloon Car Championship was open to Group 2 cars each year from 1961 to 1965 and from 1970 to 1973.

Group 2 was the specified category for the European Touring Car Challenge from 1963 to 1967  and the cars were also eligible alongside Group 5 special touring cars in 1968 and 1969. It was again the premier category when the series was renamed as the European Touring Car Championship for 1970 and continued to be so until it was replaced by Group A for 1982.

The Sports Car Club of America’s Trans-American Sedan Championship was contested by Group 2 touring cars from its inception in 1966 through to the 1972 season.

Groups 1-9

References

External links
 Historic Appendices J - of the Period, argent.fia.com

Rally groups
Rally racing
Fédération Internationale de l'Automobile
Touring car racing